John Work Garrett (May 19, 1872 – June 26, 1942) was an American diplomat.  His postings included Minister to Venezuela, Argentina, and the Netherlands, and Ambassador to Italy.

Early life
Garrett was born in Baltimore, Maryland on May 19, 1872.  He was the son of Alice Dickerson (née Whitridge) Garrett (1851–1920) and Thomas Harrison Garrett (1849–1888), who operated the family's bank in Baltimore.  He was also the grandson of John W. Garrett, a banker and the president of the Baltimore and Ohio Railroad, and nephew of Robert Garrett, who also served as President of the B&O.

Garrett graduated from Princeton University, with a B.S. degree, in 1895 and began a career at the bank owned by his family.  He later received an honorary LL.D. from St. John's College in Annapolis, Maryland.

Career
In 1901, Garrett embarked on a diplomatic career with appointment as Secretary of the United States legation at The Hague.  In 1905, he transferred to a similar position in Berlin, and in 1908 another transfer brought him to Rome.

Garrett was appointed Minister to Venezuela in 1910 and served until 1911, when he was appointed as Minister to Argentina.

In 1914, Garrett left Argentina when he was appointed as a special assistant to the Ambassador to France.  He served in this post until 1917.  As an American diplomat in Europe during World War I, Garrett took part in commissions and conferences on the handling of prisoners of war and other war-related issues.

From 1917 to 1919, Garrett served as Minister to the Netherlands and Luxembourg.

Originally a Democrat, Garrett later became a Republican and served as a Delegate to the 1920 Republican National Convention.  In 1922 he was an unsuccessful candidate for the Republican nomination for U.S. Senator, losing to incumbent Joseph I. France.  (France went on to lose the general election to William Cabell Bruce).  In 1924, he was again a Delegate to the Republican National Convention.

Garrett served as Ambassador to Italy from 1929 to 1933.

Later life

In retirement, Garrett resided at Evergreen, the Garrett family mansion which is now a museum and library of the Johns Hopkins University. Garrett and his wife, Alice Warder Garrett, entertained and patronized artists, filling the house with Tiffany lamps, paintings by Zuloaga, Pablo Picasso, Raoul Dufy, Degas and Amedeo Modigliani and a custom-designed stage by Leon Bakst.

Personal life
On December 24, 1908, Garrett was married to Alice Warder (1877–1952), who shared his love of the arts and travel.

Garrett died in Baltimore on June 26, 1942, and is buried in Baltimore's Green Mount Cemetery.

Legacy
Garrett and several of his family members were well known collectors of rare books and manuscripts, coins and other items.  He donated his papers and much of his library to Johns Hopkins University, and many of his other items are still bought and sold by collectors. 

The John Work Garrett Professorship in Politics at Princeton University was established by a gift from Garrett and his brother Robert Garrett.

References

External links

John Work Garrett Library at Johns Hopkins University, accessed December 12, 2012
John Work Garrett at the Office of the Historian, U.S. Department of State, accessed December 12, 2012
Evergreen Museum and Library at Johns Hopkins University, accessed December 12, 2012

1872 births
1942 deaths
People from Baltimore
Princeton University alumni
Maryland Democrats
Maryland Republicans
Ambassadors of the United States to Venezuela
Ambassadors of the United States to Argentina
Ambassadors of the United States to the Netherlands
Ambassadors of the United States to Luxembourg
Ambassadors of the United States to Italy
Burials at Green Mount Cemetery
United States Foreign Service personnel
20th-century American diplomats